Kang Min-ah (born March 20, 1997), is a South Korean actress. She is known for the television dramas Schoolgirl Detectives (2014–2015), True Beauty (2020–2021), and At a Distance, Spring Is Green (2021).

Filmography

Film

Television series

Web series

Music video

Awards and nominations

References

External links
 
 
 

1997 births
Living people
South Korean film actresses
South Korean television actresses
South Korean web series actresses